Harvard College is the undergraduate college of Harvard University, a private Ivy League research university in Cambridge, Massachusetts. Part of the Faculty of Arts and Sciences, Harvard College is Harvard University's traditional undergraduate program, offering AB and SB degrees. It is highly selective, with fewer than four percent of applicants being offered admission as of 2022. Harvard College students participate in over 450 extracurricular organizations and nearly all live on campus. First-year students reside in or near Harvard Yard and upperclass students reside in other on-campus residential housing.

History

The school came into existence in 1636 by vote of the Great and General Court of the Massachusetts Bay Colony—though without a single building, instructor, or student. In 1638, the college became home for North America's first known printing press, carried by the ship .
Three years later, the college was renamed in honor of deceased Charlestown minister John Harvard (1607–1638) who had bequeathed to the school his entire library and half of his monetary estate.

Harvard's first headmaster was Nathaniel Eaton (1610–1674); in 1639, he also became its first instructor to be dismissed, for overstrict discipline.
The school's first students were graduated in 1642.

The Harvard Indian College was established, with the capacity for four or five Native Americans, and in 1665 Caleb Cheeshahteaumuck (c. 1643–1666) "from the Wampanoag … did graduate from Harvard, the first Indian to do so in the colonial period."

Harvard College is currently responsible for undergraduate admissions, advising, housing, student life, athletics, and other undergraduate matters except instruction, which is the purview of the Harvard Faculty of Arts and Sciences. The body known as the President and Fellows of Harvard College retains its traditional name despite having governance of the entire university. Radcliffe College, established in 1879, originally paid Harvard faculty to repeat their lectures for women.
Since the 1970s, Harvard has been responsible for undergraduate matters for women, though women's Harvard diplomas were countersigned by the President of Radcliffe until a final merger in 1999.

Admissions 

Admission is based on academic prowess, extracurricular activities, and personal qualities. For the undergraduate class of 2025, Harvard had 57,435 applications and accepted 1,968 (3.4% acceptance rate). For the undergraduate class of 2023, the middle 50% range of SAT scores of enrolled freshmen was 710–770 for reading and writing and 750–800 for math, while the middle 50% range of the ACT composite score was 33–35.
The average high school grade point average (GPA) was 4.18. The acceptance rate for transfer students has been approximately 1%. Harvard consistently ranks first in the enrollment of recipients of the National Merit $2,500 Scholarship; it enrolled 207 such scholars in the Class of 2022.

Harvard College ended its early admissions program in 2007, but for the class of 2016 and beyond, an early action program was reintroduced.
The freshman class that entered in the fall of 2017 was the first to be majority (50.8%) nonwhite.

A federal lawsuit alleges that Harvard's admissions policies discriminate against Asian Americans, who tend to be overrepresented among students with high academic achievement.
A 2019 district court decision in the case (which has since been appealed) found no evidence of explicit racial bias but did not rule out a small amount of implicit bias.
Harvard has implemented more implicit bias training for its admissions staff in accordance with the court's recommendations.
In addition, Harvard's admissions preference for children of alumni, employees, and donors has been criticized as favoring white and wealthy candidates.

The median family income of Harvard students is $168,800, with 53% of students coming from the top 10% highest-earning families and 20% from the bottom 60%.
As of 2019, Harvard College tuition was about $48,000 and total costs about $70,000.
However, Harvard offers one of the most generous financial aid programs in the United States, with need-blind admission and 100% of financial need met for all students.
Families with incomes below $65,000 pay nothing for their children to attend, while families earning up to $150,000 pay no more than 10% of their annual incomes.
Financial aid is solely based on need; no merit or athletic scholarships are offered.

Academics

The four-year, full-time undergraduate program has a liberal arts and sciences focus.
To graduate in the usual four years, undergraduates normally take four courses per semester.

Midway through the second year, most undergraduates join one of fifty academic majors; many also declare a minor (secondary field). Joint majors (combining the requirements of two majors) and special majors (of the student's own design) are also possible.
Most majors lead to the Artium Baccalaureus (AB). Some award the Scientiae Baccalaureus (SB). There are also dual degree programs permitting students to earn both a Harvard AB and a Master of Music (MM) from either the New England Conservatory of Music or the Berklee College of Music over five years.
In most majors, an honors degree requires advanced coursework and/or a senior thesis.

Harvard College students must take a course in each of four General Education categories (Aesthetics and Culture; Ethics and Civics; Histories, Societies, Individuals; Science and Technology in Society) as well as a course in each of three academic divisions (Arts and Humanities; Social Sciences; Science and Engineering and Applied Science). They must also fulfill foreign language, expository writing, and quantitative reasoning with data requirements.
Exposure to a range of intellectual areas in parallel with pursuit of a chosen major in depth fulfills the injunction of former Harvard president Abbott Lawrence Lowell that liberal education should produce "men who know a little of everything and something well".

Some introductory courses have large enrollments, but most courses are small: the median class size is 12 students.
Funding and faculty mentorship for research is available in all disciplines for undergraduates at all levels.

Student life

House system

Nearly all undergraduates live on campus, for the first year in dormitories in or near Harvard Yard and later in the upperclass houses—administrative subdivisions of the college as well as living quarters, providing a sense of community in what might otherwise be a socially incohesive and administratively daunting university environment. Each house is presided over by two faculty deans, while its Allston Burr Resident Dean—usually a junior faculty member—supervises undergraduates' day-to-day academic and disciplinary well-being.

The faculty deans and resident dean are assisted by other members of the Senior Common Room—select graduate students (tutors), faculty, and university officials brought into voluntary association with each house. The faculty deans and resident dean reside in the house, as do resident tutors. Terms like tutor, Senior Common Room, and Junior Common Room reflect a debt to the constituent college systems at Oxford and Cambridge from which Harvard's system took inspiration.

The houses were created by President Lowell in the 1930s to combat what he saw as pernicious social stratification engendered by the private, off-campus living arrangements of many undergraduates at that time. Lowell's solution was to provide every man—Harvard was male-only at the time—with on-campus accommodations throughout his time at the college; Lowell also saw great benefits in other features of the house system, such as the relaxed discussions—academic or otherwise—which he hoped would take place among undergraduates and members of the Senior Common Room over meals in each house's dining hall.

How students come to live in particular houses has changed greatly over time. Under the original "draft" system, masters (now called "faculty deans") negotiated privately over the assignment of students. From the 1960s to the mid-1990s, each student ranked the houses according to personal preference, with a lottery resolving the oversubscription of more popular houses. Today, groups of one to eight freshmen form a block which is then assigned, essentially at random, to an upperclass house.

The nine "River Houses" are south of Harvard Yard, near the Charles River: Adams, Dunster, Eliot, Kirkland, Leverett, Lowell, Mather, Quincy, and Winthrop. Their construction was financed largely by a 1928 gift from Yale alumnus Edward Harkness, who, frustrated in his attempts to initiate a similar project at his alma mater, eventually offered $11 million to Harvard.

Construction of the first houses began in 1929,
but the land on which they were built had been assembled decades before. After graduating from Harvard in 1895, Edward W. Forbes found himself inspired by the Oxford and Cambridge systems during two years of study in England; on returning to the United States he set out to acquire the land between Harvard Yard and the Charles River that was not already owned by Harvard or an associated entity. By 1918, that ambition had been largely fulfilled and the assembled land transferred to Harvard.

The three "Quad Houses" enjoy a residential setting half a mile northwest of Harvard Yard. These were built by Radcliffe College and housed Radcliffe College students until the Harvard and Radcliffe residential systems merged in 1977.
They are Cabot, Currier, and Pforzheimer House. A thirteenth house, Dudley House, is nonresidential but fulfills, for some graduate students and the (very few) undergraduates living off campus, the administrative and social functions provided to on-campus residents by the other twelve houses. Harvard's residential houses are paired with Yale's residential colleges in sister relationships.

Student government 

The Harvard Undergraduate Council (UC) was the student government of Harvard College until it was abolished by a student referendum in 2022. It was replaced by the Harvard Undergraduate Association (HUA).

Athletics 

The Harvard Crimson fields 42 intercollegiate sports teams in the NCAA Division I Ivy League, more than any other NCAA Division I college in the country. Every two years, the Harvard and Yale track and field teams come together to compete against a combined Oxford and Cambridge team in the oldest continuous international amateur competition in the world. As with other Ivy League universities, Harvard does not offer athletic scholarships.

Harvard's athletic rivalry with Yale is intense in every sport in which they meet, coming to a climax each fall in the annual football meeting, which dates back to 1875 and is usually called simply "The Game". While Harvard's football team is no longer one of the best as it was in football's early days, both Harvard and Yale have influenced the way the game is played. In 1903, Harvard Stadium introduced a new era into football with the first permanent reinforced concrete stadium of its kind in the country.

Even older than HarvardYale football rivalry, the Harvard–Yale Regatta is held each June on the Thames River in eastern Connecticut. The Harvard crew is typically considered to be one of the top teams in the country in rowing. Other sports in which Harvard teams are particularly strong are men's ice hockey, squash, and men's and women's fencing. Harvard's men's ice hockey team won the school's first NCAA Championship in any team sport in 1989, and Harvard also won the Intercollegiate Sailing Association National Championships in 2003. Harvard was the first Ivy League school to win an NCAA Championship in a women's sport when its women's lacrosse team won in 1990.

The school color is crimson, which is also the name of Harvard's sports teams and the student newspaper, The Harvard Crimson. The color was unofficially adopted (in preference to magenta) by an 1875 vote of the student body, although the association with some form of red can be traced back to 1858, when Charles William Eliot, a young graduate student who would later become Harvard's 21st and longest-serving president (1869–1909), bought red bandanas for his crew so they could more easily be distinguished by spectators at a regatta.

Fight songs 

Harvard has several fight songs, the most played of which, especially at football, are "Ten Thousand Men of Harvard" and "Harvardiana". While "Fair Harvard" is actually the alma mater, "Ten Thousand Men" is better known outside the university. The Harvard University Band performs these fight songs and other cheers at football and hockey games. These were parodied by Harvard alumnus Tom Lehrer in his song "Fight Fiercely, Harvard", which he composed while an undergraduate.

Athletics history
By the late 19th century, critics of intercollegiate athletics, including Harvard president Charles William Eliot, believed that sports had become over-commercialized and took students away from their studies. They called for limitations on all sports.
This opposition prompted Harvard's athletic committee to target "minor" sports—basketball and hockey—for reform in order to deflect attention from the major sports: football, baseball, track, and crew. The committee made it difficult for the basketball team to operate by denying financial assistance and limiting the number of overnight away games in which the team could participate.

Student organizations 

Harvard has more than 450 undergraduate student organizations.
The Phillips Brooks House Association acts as an umbrella service organization.

Notable alumni

Athletics
 Craig Adams
 Matt Birk
 Ryan Fitzpatrick
 Ross Friedman 
 Bobby Jones
 Jeremy Lin
 Dominic Moore
 Christopher Nowinski
 Paul Wylie
 Malcolm Howard (Olympic Gold Medalist)
Biology
 John Tyler Bonner
 Jared Diamond
 Eric Kandel
 George Minot
 Kiran Musunuru
 Gregg L. Semenza
 Harold M. Weintraub
Business
 Steve Ballmer
 Lloyd Blankfein
 Jim Cramer
 Bill Gates (did not graduate)
 Kenneth C. Griffin
 Trip Hawkins
 William Randolph Hearst (did not graduate)
 Andy Jassy
 Sumner Redstone
 Sheryl Sandberg
 Eduardo Saverin
 Mark Zuckerberg (did not graduate)
Chemistry
 Martin Chalfie
 Walter Gilbert
 Martin Karplus
 William Standish Knowles
 Charles Sanders Peirce
 Theodore William Richards
 William Howard Stein
 James B. Sumner
 Roger Y. Tsien
Economics
 Ben Bernanke
 Martin Feldstein
 Jason Furman
 Michael Kremer
 Steven Levitt
 Merton Miller
 Christopher A. Sims
 Robert Solow
 James Tobin
Journalism
 Ross Douthat
 Nicholas Kristof
 Anthony Lewis
 Walter Lippmann
 David E. Sanger
 Chris Wallace
 Kristen Welker
 Matthew Yglesias
Law
 Harry Blackmun
 Merrick Garland
 Oliver Wendell Holmes Jr.
 Mark F. Pomerantz
 John Roberts
 David Souter
 Ketanji Brown Jackson
Literature
 James Agee
 William S. Burroughs
 Michael Crichton
 E. E. Cummings
 John Dos Passos
 T. S. Eliot
 Amanda Gorman
 Norman Mailer
 Maxwell Perkins
 Erich Segal
 Wallace Stevens
 John Updike
Mathematics
 Manjul Bhargava
 Buddy Fletcher
 David Mumford
 Daniel Quillen
Performing arts
 Karen Gaviola
 Tatyana Ali
 Darren Aronofsky
 Paris Barclay
 Leonard Bernstein
 Andy Borowitz
 Amy Brenneman
 Carter Burwell
 Nestor Carbonell
 Rivers Cuomo
 Matt Damon (did not graduate)
 Fred Gwynne
 Rashida Jones
 Tommy Lee Jones
 Colin Jost
 Tom Lehrer
 Jack Lemmon
 Ryan Leslie
 John Lithgow
 Donal Logue
 Yo-Yo Ma
 Terrence Malick
 Tom Morello
 Dean Norris
 Conan O'Brien
 Natalie Portman
 Joshua Redman
 Meredith Salenger
 Elisabeth Shue
 Whit Stillman
 Mira Sorvino
 James Toback
Philosophy
 Donald Davidson
 Daniel Dennett
 Ralph Waldo Emerson
 William James (did not graduate)
 Thomas Kuhn
 George Santayana
 Henry David Thoreau
 Cornel West
Physics
 Philip W. Anderson
 Percy Williams Bridgman
 Roy J. Glauber
 Theodore Hall
 David Lee
 J. Robert Oppenheimer
 Saul Perlmutter
 Neil deGrasse Tyson
 Kenneth G. Wilson
Politics
 John Adams
 John Quincy Adams
 Samuel Adams
 Charlie Baker
 Benazir Bhutto
 Antony Blinken
 Richard Blumenthal
 Pete Buttigieg
 Pedro Albizu Campos
 Tom Cotton
 Shaun Donovan 
 Sir George Downing
 Al Franken
 Rahul Gandhi (did not graduate)
 Elbridge Gerry
 Al Gore
 John Hancock
 Ted Kennedy
 John F. Kennedy
 Robert F. Kennedy
 Henry Kissinger
 Ned Lamont
 Phil Murphy
 Masako Owada
 Deval Patrick
 Gina Raimondo
 Tom Ridge
 Jay Rockefeller
 Franklin D. Roosevelt
 Theodore Roosevelt
 Ben Sasse
 Chuck Schumer
 Pat Toomey
Religion
 Aga Khan IV
 Cotton Mather
 Increase Mather
 Theodore Parker
 Samuel Parris
Miscellaneous
 Buckminster Fuller (did not graduate)
 Philip Johnson
 Ted Kaczynski
 Arthur M. Schlesinger Jr.
 Stephanie Wilson

Footnotes

References

Further reading

External links

 

1636 establishments in Massachusetts
Educational institutions established in the 1630s
Harvard Square
College
Harvard Faculty of Arts and Sciences